Muthal Seethanam is a 1992 Indian Tamil-language romantic drama film written and directed by Erode Soundar in his directorial debut and produced by R. B. Choudary. The film stars Shiva and Devi Meenakshi. It was released on 14 August 1992.

Plot

Cast 
 Shiva as the washerman's brother
 Devi Meenakshi as the landlord's daughter
 Goundamani
 Rajesh
 Napoleon as Devi Meenakshi's uncle
 Kavitha as Devi Meenakshi's stepmother
 Erode Soundar as the barber
 Senthil
 Mohanapriya
 Prathiba
Radha Ravi
 Kumarimuthu

Production 
Muthal Seethanam is the directorial debut of Erode Soundar who also worked as writer and also portrayed a supporting role. It was produced by R. B. Choudary under Super Good Films. Cinematography was handled by K. Ram Singh, and editing by K. Thanigachalam.

Soundtrack 
The soundtrack was composed by Soundaryan.

Release and reception 
Muthal Seethanam was released on 14 August 1992. The critic from The Indian Express criticised the performance of Shiva, saying he "has miles to go before he can put up a credible performance" and added that Rajesh "with bloodshot eyes does not look quite comfortable in his villainy".

References

External links 
 

1990s Tamil-language films
1992 directorial debut films
1992 films
1992 romantic drama films
Indian romantic drama films
Super Good Films films